Peterhead South and Cruden is one of the nineteen wards used to elect members of the Aberdeenshire Council. It elects three Councillors.

Councillors

Election Results

2022 Election
2022 Aberdeenshire Council election

2017 Election
2017 Aberdeenshire Council election

2012 Election
2012 Aberdeenshire Council election

2007 Election
2007 Aberdeenshire Council election

References

Wards of Aberdeenshire